Salwa Nassar (1913 — February 17, 1967) was a Lebanese nuclear physicist and college administrator. She was the first Lebanese woman to earn a PhD in physics.

Early life
Salwa Chukri Nassar was from Dhour-el-Shweir, and attended Brummana High School and the American Junior College for Women in Beirut.  She was the first woman student in the mathematics program at American University of Beirut. She taught for a few years at Birzeit College after graduating, then enrolled in graduate school at Smith College, where she earned a master's degree in physics in 1940. She completed doctoral studies at the University of California at Berkeley in 1945, where she was the eighth woman to earn a PhD in physics. She was also the first Lebanese woman to earn a PhD in physics.

Career
Salwa Nassar taught physics and did research at the American University of Beirut. Nassar's academic publications included research articles with titles such as "Cascade Showers and Mesotron-Produced Secondaries in Lead" (1946), but also broader essays on higher education, such as "The Wonders of Creativity" (1962). She was responsible for building the physics department's resources of laboratory equipment, and a founder of the Lebanese Institute for Scientific Research. She was named head of the physics department at AUB in 1965, the same year she became the first Lebanese president of the Beirut College for Women.

Personal life
Salwa Nassar died in 1967, from leukemia, aged 54 years. The Salwa C. Nassar Foundation for Lebanese Studies was named in her memory.

References

Further reading
Marie Aziz Sabri, Pioneering Profiles: Beirut College for Women (Khayat Books 1967). (Includes a chapter on Salwa Nassar.)

1913 births
1967 deaths
Lebanese physicists
Smith College alumni
University of California, Berkeley alumni
American University of Beirut alumni
Women in Lebanon
People from Dhour El Choueir
Deaths from leukemia